The Battle of Red Bank was a battle fought on October 22, 1777 during the American Revolutionary War in which a British and Hessian force was sent to take Fort Mercer on the left bank (or New Jersey side) of the Delaware River just south of Philadelphia, but was decisively defeated by a far inferior force of colonial defenders. Although the British did take Fort Mercer a month later, the victory supplied a sorely-needed morale boost to the American cause, delayed British plans to consolidate gains in Philadelphia, and relieved pressure on General George Washington's army to the north of the city.

Prelude to battle

After the British capture of Philadelphia on September 26, 1777 and the failure of the American surprise attack against the British camp at the Battle of Germantown on October 4, the Americans tried to deny the British use of the city by blockading the Delaware River. To that end, two forts were constructed commanding the river. One was Fort Mercer on the New Jersey side at the Red Bank Plantation in what was then part of Deptford Township (now National Park, New Jersey). The other was Fort Mifflin on Mud Island, in the Delaware River just south of its confluence with the Schuylkill River, on the Pennsylvania side opposite Fort Mercer. So long as the Americans held both forts, British navy ships could not reach Philadelphia to resupply the army. In addition to the forts, the Americans possessed a small flotilla of Continental Navy ships on the Delaware supplemented by the Pennsylvania State Navy. The flotilla consisted of sloops, schooners, galleys, an assortment of floating batteries and fourteen old vessels laden  with barrels of tar to be used as a means of defending the river. The fleet was armed with about one hundred cannon total, under the overall command of Commodore John Hazelwood. The fleet of Admiral Howe's consisted of eight or nine war vessels and several transports. His vessels were fully manned, with 285 guns on the war vessels alone. On just two of the vessels stranded in the river, Howe commanded more officers and men than Commodore Hazelwood had in his entire fleet.

On October 18, General Sir William Howe, the commander of the British Army, evacuated his camp at Germantown and pulled his forces inside the city of Philadelphia. He sent a part of his force to capture the two American forts denying him use of the Delaware River. Earlier, Howe had sent a group of men via Webb's Ferry, at the mouth of the Schuylkill River, to marshy Providence Island (actually on the Pennsylvania mainland by Mud Island) to construct artillery batteries to bombard Fort Mifflin. The first bombardment of Fort Mifflin came on October 11. This was merely a desultory attack which convinced the British to expand and improve their batteries.

Meanwhile, 2,000 Hessian mercenary troops under the command of Colonel Carl von Donop landed at Cooper's Ferry in Camden, New Jersey, about  upriver from Fort Mercer, and made preparations to attack the fort, located on the high ground at Red Bank. The fort was garrisoned with four hundred men with fourteen pieces of cannon, and were reported to have not been intimidated.  At 4 p.m. Donop sent an officer and a drummer with a flag and summons to surrender with the ultimatum, "The King of England orders his rebellious subjects to lay down their arms", and warned that, if they stand the battle, no quarter whatever would be given, to which Colonel Greene promptly replied, "We ask no quarters, nor will we give any". The garrison at the fort replied that they would defend the fort to the last man.  Since it was ascertained that the fort was lightly garrisoned, Donop decided to attack directly, and declared "We'll change the name from Fort Red Bank to Fort Donop."

Battle

Von Donop, whose attack had been repulsed at the Second Battle of Trenton, was eager to avenge what he considered to be a humiliation. He declared to his men: "Either that will be Fort Donop or I shall be dead."

Donop soon realized the arduous task that was entrusted to him and asked Howe in vain for more artillery, but Howe ordered him to wait for the British fleet to come up river to assist him, and that if Donop could not capture the fort the British would, an order that apparently belittled Donop.
 
On October 20, 1777, five British warships under the command of Captain Hamond, made their way  through the lower chevaux-de-frise and sailed up the river. Among these vessels were HMS Augusta, outfitted with sixty-four guns and commanded by Captain Francis Reynolds.
 
Von Donop divided his force into two groups totaling 1,200 men for a two-pronged attack upon the fort on the morning of October 22. Von Donop and Hessian grenadier Lieutenant Colonel von Linsing were to attack the southern part of the fort, while Colonel Friedrich Ludwig von Minnigerode's grenadiers and Lieutenant Colonel Werner von Mirbach's infantry were to attack the northern and eastern approaches.

With five British men-of-war in the river to support the attack, von Donop was convinced that the fort would be in his hands by nightfall. After a cannonade by the Hessian artillery, Linsing moved against the nine-foot-high southern parapet, and his men were cut down by devastating cannon and musket fire and were forced to retreat. On the north, Minnigerode's grenadiers managed to scale the ramparts of an abandoned section of the fort. But when they moved on they were confronted by a tangled mass of felled trees with pointed branches, a kind of abatis, protecting the main wall of the fort. With little in the way of proper tools, they were soon spotted trying to claw their way through the barricade and were fired upon by the Americans waiting for them on the other side. The Continental and Pennsylvania navies provided enfilading fire against the Hessians. Von Donop was wounded in the thigh during the southern attack and was left on the battlefield by his retreating troops. Mortally wounded, von Donop died three days later in the Whitall House, a farmhouse just outside the southern works of the fort between the fort and Woodbury Creek.

To make matters worse for the British and Hessians, the six British men-of-war were engaged by smaller American gunboats. During the engagement, two of the ships, the 64-gun ship-of-the-line HMS Augusta and the sloop of war HMS Merlin ran aground on a shoal trying to avoid underwater obstacles called chevaux-de-frise or stockades, which were rows of large wooden spears weighted down on the bottom of the river by heavy crates filled with rocks, designed to pierce the hulls of intruding British warships. Overnight attempts to free the ships were unsuccessful. Fort Mifflin and the Pennsylvania Navy engaged the stranded ships the next morning, with cannons and fire rafts, respectively. Augusta caught fire and within an hour the fire reached the magazine and the ship exploded with such force the explosion was heard in Philadelphia. The Augusta was the largest ship lost by the British in both the Revolutionary War and the War of 1812. Accounts vary as to the cause of the fire. In one account, the loss of Augusta was attributed to accidental ignition by the British. Navy historian James Fenimore Cooper's claims that the sides of the hull of the Augusta was packed with hay to repel musket and cannon shot, and during the exchange the hay caught fire and the fire rapidly spread. Crew members gave their testimony, but none could be definite. None remembered having seen or heard the explosion of any powder on the decks. Only Midshipman Reid ventured to suppose that the fire originated from the cannon wads. Admiral Lord Howe seemed to accept this explanation. Soon after, the crew of Merlin was ordered to abandon the ship and destroy it also.

Aftermath
The Hessian army reported casualties of 377 killed and wounded with 20 missing or captured, while the Americans reported their losses at 14 killed and 27 wounded. Frustrated by the failure to capture Fort Mercer, Howe ordered the Hessian regiments withdrawn from New Jersey while he made plans to attack Fort Mifflin by a massive artillery bombardment. By early November the British artillery batteries on Providence Island were complete, and a number of warships were available in support. On November 10, 1777, the British opened a full-scale bombardment of Fort Mifflin which lasted for five days. Six British warships, with two small floating batteries, HMS Vigilant and HMS Fury, also joined the bombardment to rake Fort Mifflin at close range. After five days, on November 15, the commanding officer of Fort Mifflin, Major Simeon Thayer, with 250 reported casualties among his 400 men and with ammunition running low, abandoned the fort that evening, leaving the American flag flying, and evacuated his men to Fort Mercer. The next morning a small party of British troops landed unopposed at deserted Fort Mifflin, hauled down the American flag, and ran up the British Union Jack atop the ruined fort. The bombardment of Fort Mifflin cost the British only a reported 13 sailors and troops killed with 24 wounded, with some damage done to some of their warships and land batteries.

Howe then sent Lord Cornwallis with 2,000 men to attack Fort Mercer, landing them by ferry at Billingsport,  to the south. Rather than let the garrison be captured in an overwhelming British assault, Colonel Christopher Greene decided to abandon the fort on November 20, leaving the British to occupy it the following day.

George Washington's scheme of starving the British out of Philadelphia had failed with the loss of the two forts. His only hope now was to lure the British out of Philadelphia into another major land battle at his camp at nearby White Marsh. Although Howe did sortie from the city to launch a feint at the American camp in early December, he felt the American position was too strong and retired to Philadelphia for the rest of the winter. Washington then moved his army to Valley Forge for the winter.

Today

Today, the site of the Battle of Red Bank is a part of the Gloucester County, New Jersey Parks system called Red Bank Battlefield Park.

The  park is open to visitors during daylight hours. The Whitall House may be visited during more limited hours. An annual reenactment of the battle takes place on the park grounds in October. In the early 1980s, a lifeguard was on duty and swimming was permitted in the Delaware River.

In June 2022, a mass grave containing the remains of what are believed to be 12 Hessian soldiers was discovered while excavating the outer defensive ditch of Fort Mercer.

See also
 Siege of Fort Mifflin
 Fort Billingsport
 Benjamin Loxley
 List of American Revolutionary War battles

Notes

Citations

Bibliography
 
 
 
A Battlefield Atlas of the American Revolution; author: Craig L. Symonds; The National & Aviation Publishing Company of America, Inc. 1986. 
The Delaware Bay and River Defenses of Philadelphia, 1775–1777; author: John W. Jackson; 1977

External links
Red Bank Battlefield Park Website
History of Fort Mercer at Try Philly com.
Model of a 64-gun British Man of War
General Howe report on Battle pp.651-652

1777 in New Jersey
1777 in the United States
American Revolutionary War sites
Red Bank
Red Bank
Red Bank
Red Bank
Red Bank
Gloucester County, New Jersey